Patrick Godfrey FREng, FICE, FCGI, Hon FIA, F.Energy Inst. is a British civil engineer, professor of systems engineering at the University of Bristol, and director of the Systems Centre and the EPSRC Industrial Doctorate Centre in Systems at the University of Bristol and the University of Bath.

Early life
Godfrey was born in 1946. His first passion was sailing  but he left school to read Civil Engineering at Imperial College.

Career
After graduating Godfrey worked for Halcrow, Consulting Engineers  and was asked to go to the Seychelles to supervise marine works. He was part of the team that designed and constructed the Royal Sovereign Lighthouse. By 1973 Godfrey was working on various offshore projects. In particular, he was a leading member of the group that designed and built an experimental offshore tower in Christchurch Bay. Godfrey then led the team advising New Zealand's Petrocorp about the engineering of the Maui field off the west coast of North Island. Godfrey became Managing Director of Halcrow Offshore in the late 1980s. Later he was asked to use his experience in oil and gas to the core Halcrow civil engineering business. 

Godfrey was part author of the Engineering Council Code of Practice and Guidelines on Risk Issues. As a result, in 1993 he was commissioned by the Construction Industry Research and Information Association  to produce a client's guide to controlling risk. At Halcrow he was asked to find ways of reducing the risks of ship collisions at the Second Severn Crossing whilst also saving money. The success of this project led directly to his appointment as consultant to the British Airports Authority on Heathrow Terminal 5 to manage risks to the project during the 4 years of the public enquiry.

In the early 1990s, Godfrey was appointed Visiting Professor of Civil Engineering Systems at the University of Bristol. He co-authored with David Blockley ’Doing it Differently—Systems for Rethinking Construction’ which was awarded a Chartered Institute of Building (CIOB), Gold Medal and Author of the Year in 2000.

In 2006 Godfrey was appointed Professor of Systems Engineering at the University of Bristol, and Director of the Systems Centre and the EPSRC Industrial Doctorate Centre in Systems at the University of Bristol and the University of Bath.

Awards
Hon DEng 2004 University of Bristol
 CIOB Gold Medal 2000 
 INCOSE Fellows award 2013 for innovations in the management of complex systems through integration of "soft" and "hard" systems approaches in practice, education and research

Selected projects 
Heathrow T5
Experimental offshore tower in Christchurch Bay

References 

Academics of the University of Bristol
British civil engineers
20th-century British engineers
21st-century British engineers
Fellows of the Institution of Civil Engineers
Fellows of the Royal Academy of Engineering
Academics of the University of Bath
Alumni of Imperial College London
Living people
1946 births